The Seder ha-Mishmarah is a study cycle devised by the Ben Ish Ḥai and used by some Mizrahi Jews (Jews of Near and Middle Eastern origin) for reading the whole of the Hebrew Bible and the Mishnah in the course of a year. It depends on the cycle of the weekly Torah portions read in the synagogue.

Some communities have a custom of public reading, whereby on each Shabbat afternoon the whole of the mishmarah for the following Shabbat is read out loud. In others, individuals use it as a basis for private study.  The usual form of the cycle is set out in the table below.

This cycle is unrelated to that for Chok l'Yisrael, which is a study cycle based on the works of Rabbi Hayyim ben Joseph Vital and revised by Rabbi Chaim Joseph David Azulai.  This too is often published in book form and is widely popular among Near and Middle Eastern Jews.  Differences between the two are:
 The Seder ha-Mishmarah does not include Targum or commentaries on the Torah portion; Chok l'Yisrael includes both;
 Chok l'Yisrael does not include the whole of Nevi'im, Ketuvim or the Mishnah, and does not present the excerpts in a continuous order through the year;
 Chok l'Yisrael also includes excerpts from the Talmud, the Zohar and works of Jewish law and morality;
 Chok l'Yisrael is designed for daily rather than weekly reading.

Other uses
In Mishnaic Hebrew mishmarah (or mishmeret) means a "watch", that is to say a division of the night (usually one-third).  In Temple times, a mishmar (or mishmarah) also referred to a group of priests whose turn it was to officiate.

In addition to the study cycle described above, the term mishmarah is used for a nocturnal prayer or study session preceding a celebration such as a wedding or a Brit milah or a festival such as Hoshanah Rabba or following a death.  This usage was derived either from the above meaning as a watch in the night or from the practice of watching over a corpse.  However, by folk etymology the word is sometimes interpreted as a portmanteau of "Mishnah" and "Gemara", to refer to the texts studied.

See also
 Other study cycles under Torah study #Study cycles

External links and references
Endnotes

References and external links
Ḥoq le-Ya'aqov, which sets out all the readings in book form
Table at end of Tefillat Yesharim (Iraqi prayer book)
Mishmarah tab on http://www.pizmonim.org website

Jewish prayer and ritual texts
Jewish law and rituals
Mizrahi Jews topics